Gaius Fabius Ambustus may refer to:

 Gaius Fabius Ambustus (consul)
 Gaius Fabius Ambustus (magister equitum 315 BC)

See also
  Ambustus (disambiguation)